Barhabise may refer to:

Barhabise, Bagmati, Nepal
Barhabise, Seti, Nepal